Pseudoalteromonas issachenkonii is a marine bacterium which was isolated from the brown alga Fucus evanescens near the Kurile Islands.

References

External links
 
Type strain of Pseudoalteromonas issachenkonii at BacDive -  the Bacterial Diversity Metadatabase

Alteromonadales